Katherine Vera Aumer (formerly Katherine Aumer-Ryan, born 1981) is an American social psychologist.  Her current research focuses on interpersonal relationships and identity issues concerning both culture and race. Her work has also focused on the psychology of hatred. Formerly an associate professor and chair of psychology at Hawaii Pacific University, she currently serves as an assistant professor of psychology at the University of Hawaiʻi – West Oʻahu.

Biography
Aumer received her B.A. in Psychology and Theatre in 2003 from the University of Iowa and her PhD from the University of Texas at Austin in 2008.

Aumer has been published in Social Justice Research, Personality and Social Psychology Bulletin, The Proceedings of the American Society for Information Science and Technology, Ethnic and Racial Studies, Sexual and Relationship Therapy, Journal of Relationships Research, Interpersona, and Proceedings of the Human Factors and Ergonomics Society Annual Meeting.

References

1981 births
Living people
21st-century American women
21st-century American psychologists
American women psychologists
University of Iowa alumni
University of Texas at Austin College of Liberal Arts alumni
Hawaii Pacific University
Place of birth missing (living people)